Marzamemi is a southern Italian hamlet of Pachino and Noto, two municipalities part of the Province of Syracuse, Sicily.

It has a population of 367.

In 1959, a Byzantine merchant ship was found near Marzamemi. The vessel, which might date back to the 6th century during the reign of Justinian I, contained decorative elements of a church’s nave.

References

Bibliography

External links
 Marzamemi on Comune di Pachino's official website
 

Frazioni of the Province of Syracuse
Populated coastal places in Italy